Hadzhiev Glacier is the 12 km long in south-north direction and 4 km wide glacier on the north side of Havre Mountains in northern Alexander Island, Antarctica. It is situated north-northwest of Foreman Glacier, north of Wubbold Glacier and east of Lennon Glacier, flows northwards between Igralishte Peak on the west and Mount Newman on the east, leaves Havre Mountains and joins Bongrain Ice Piedmont.

The feature is named after the Bulgarian composer Parashkev Hadzhiev (1912-1992).

Location
British mapping in 1971.

Maps
 British Antarctic Territory. Scale 1:200000 topographic map. DOS 610 – W 69 70. Tolworth, UK, 1971
 Antarctic Digital Database (ADD). Scale 1:250000 topographic map of Antarctica. Scientific Committee on Antarctic Research (SCAR). Since 1993, regularly upgraded and updated

References
 Bulgarian Antarctic Gazetteer. Antarctic Place-names Commission. (details in Bulgarian, basic data in English)
 Hadzhiev Glacier. SCAR Composite Gazetteer of Antarctica

Glaciers of Alexander Island
Bulgaria and the Antarctic